Alexey Alexeyevich Prokurorov (25 March 1964 – 10 October 2008) was a Soviet/Russian cross-country skier who competed in the late 1980s and 1990s for both the Soviet Union and Russia.

Career
Prokurorov was born in the village of Mishino of Vladimir Oblast, Russian SFSR, Soviet Union.

Prokurorov's biggest successes were winning the gold medal in the 30 km freestyle and the silver medal in the 4 × 10 km relay at the 1988 Winter Olympics in Calgary.

At the FIS Nordic World Ski Championships, Prokurorov earned a total of six medals. This included one gold (30 km: 1997), one silver (10 km: 1997), and four bronzes (50 km: 1989, 4 × 10 km relay: 1993, 30 km: 1995, 10 km + 15 km combined pursuit: 1997). He also won the 50 km event twice at the Holmenkollen ski festival (1993, 1998). He also won the Russian championship title 13 times.

Prokurorov received the Holmenkollen medal, the highest Norwegian skiing award, in 1998 (shared with Fred Børre Lundberg, Larissa Lazutina and Harri Kirvesniemi).

Prokurorov was a flag bearer of Russian team at the 1998 Winter Olympics and 2002 Winter Olympics.

Prokurorov retired after the 2001/2002 season at the age of 39. After retirement, he was Chief coach of the Russian women cross-country skiing team. He received state honors for his services to sports.

He died in a road accident in Vladimir on 10 October 2008, when he was hit by a car driven by a drunk man as he was crossing the road.

Cross-country skiing results
All results are sourced from the International Ski Federation (FIS).

Olympic Games
 2 medals – (1 gold, 1 silver)

World Championships
 6 medals – (1 gold, 1 silver, 4 bronze)

World Cup

Individual podiums
 9 victories
 22 podiums

Team podiums
 3 victories
 16 podiums

References

1964 births
2008 deaths
People from Vladimir Oblast
Cross-country skiers at the 1988 Winter Olympics
Cross-country skiers at the 1992 Winter Olympics
Cross-country skiers at the 1994 Winter Olympics
Cross-country skiers at the 1998 Winter Olympics
Cross-country skiers at the 2002 Winter Olympics
Holmenkollen medalists
Holmenkollen Ski Festival winners
Olympic cross-country skiers of the Soviet Union
Olympic cross-country skiers of the Unified Team
Olympic cross-country skiers of Russia
Olympic gold medalists for the Soviet Union
Olympic silver medalists for the Soviet Union
Road incident deaths in Russia
Pedestrian road incident deaths
Russian male cross-country skiers
Soviet male cross-country skiers
Olympic medalists in cross-country skiing
FIS Nordic World Ski Championships medalists in cross-country skiing
Medalists at the 1988 Winter Olympics
Universiade medalists in cross-country skiing
Universiade bronze medalists for the Soviet Union
Competitors at the 1985 Winter Universiade
Sportspeople from Vladimir Oblast